Isispynten is the most eastern point of Isisøyane, east of Nordaustlandet, Svalbard. It was earlier regarded as a headland of Nordaustlandet, but after the retreat of Austfonna, it became apparent that the point was on a separate small island.

References

Headlands of Svalbard